On June 29, 1995, the drinking water supply in Kharkiv, Ukraine was polluted due to flooding. Tap water was cut off in the city for about a month.

Chronology 
On June 29, 1995, torrential rain flooded the streets of Kharkiv. The Dykanivka wastewater treatment plant was flooded as well, since it was designed to collect water from the city's storm drains along with sewage. This resulted in spill of polluted and untreated water into the nearby Udy River. To prevent further spillage, the local authorities stopped tap water supply for the entire city until water was pumped out of the flooded well and pumps were replaced. It took about a month to resume supply of treated tap water. During this period the local authorities established limited drinking water distribution to organizations (including hospitals) and the population.  Drinking water was brought up by tank trucks to designated areas for distribution. Several international organizations including NATO provided assistance. This was the first instance of cooperation between NATO and Ukraine.

References

External links
 "Environmental disaster shuts down Ukrainian city", Green Left Weekly, 2 August 1995

Engineering failures
1995 industrial disasters
History of Kharkiv
Water supply and sanitation in Ukraine
1995 in Ukraine
Environmental disasters in Ukraine
June 1995 events in Europe
Health disasters in Ukraine
20th century in Kharkiv
1995 disasters in Ukraine